The 12th constituency of Pest County is one of the single member constituencies of the National Assembly, the national legislature of Hungary. The constituency standard abbreviation: Pest 12. OEVK.

Since 2014, it has been represented by László Földi of the Fidesz–KDNP party alliance.

Geography
The 12th constituency is located in south-eastern part of Pest County.

List of municipalities
The constituency includes the following municipalities:

Members
The constituency was first represented by László Földi of the KDNP from 2014, and he was re-elected in 2018 and 2022.

References

Pest 12th